Thierry Pastor (born 4 March 1960, in French Algeria) is a French singer and composer known for his 1980s hits "Le Coup de folie" and "Sur des Musiques Noires" (#12 in France). He was also a former musician of Gilbert Montagné and his first single was produced by Roland Magdane.

Discography

Albums
 1982 : Le Grand Show
 1988 : Avec elle
 1992 : Des Histoires
 1993 : Passé composé
 1999 : Coup de folie (best of)

Singles
 1981 : "Le Coup de Folie"
 1982 : "Where Is My Love"
 1983 : "Magic Music"
 1985 : "Sur des Musiques Noires" – #12 in France
 1986 : "Équateur"
 1987 : "Dernier Matin d'Asie" (charity single recorded by Sampan)
 1988 : "T'en vas pas"
 1989 : "Mister T"

References

1960 births
French-language singers
French male singers
French pop singers
Living people